Goncharov is an internet meme surrounding a nonexistent 1973 gangster film of the same name. Goncharov was imagined by users on Tumblr as a joke, often with the tagline "The greatest mafia movie ever made". It is usually described as a mafia film set in Naples, with the involvement of Martin Scorsese. Those discussing the film have devised a fictionalized cast list that includes Robert De Niro, Al Pacino, John Cazale, Gene Hackman, Cybill Shepherd and Harvey Keitel.

Goncharov initially originated when a Tumblr user posted a picture of a pair of "knockoff boots" that featured details suggesting the film's existence in place of a brand label. This post was reblogged in August 2020 with the joking allusion that Goncharov was a real film; this reblog is generally regarded as the genesis of the meme. The meme went viral in November 2022, after a poster for Goncharov was created and shared online. This sparked an elaborate fiction of its narrative content and production, described in posts on Tumblr and elsewhere as if the film were real. Goncharov has inspired an online fandom, received significant coverage in the media, and garnered responses from notable individuals, including Scorsese, generally playing along with the meme.

Fictitious plot and production history

Although many details are inconsistent due to the collaborative nature of its conception, Goncharov is generally described as a mafia film, produced in 1973. In the metafictional narrative of the film's existence, it is generally imagined that it had a troubled production and ultimately never received a proper release, thus becoming a lost film. This serves as an explanation for its supposed obscurity.

Set in Naples in the aftermath of the dissolution of the Soviet Union, it is said to star Robert De Niro in the role of the protagonist, Lo Straniero, also known as Goncharov, who is a Russian hitman and former discotheque manager. The narrative includes a love triangle subplot involving Goncharov, his wife Katya (said to be portrayed by Cybill Shepherd in the film's fictional cast), and the character of Andrey (Harvey Keitel), whose relationship with Goncharov is described as having homoerotic overtones. Katya similarly absconds from Goncharov to engage in a romantically charged relationship with a woman named Sofia (Sophia Loren); both Goncharov/Andrey and Katya/Sofia are popular ships within Goncharov's fandom. Another prominent character is Joseph "Ice Pick Joe" Morelli (John Cazale), an ostensibly psychopathic assassin notorious for his trademark murder weapon of ice picks, whose subplot in Goncharov is said to feature themes of mental illness and childhood trauma. The story additionally features a frequently recurring motif of clocks.

Fictitious cast and crew

Robert De Niro as Lo Straniero/Goncharov
Cybill Shepherd as Katya Michailov Goncharova
Harvey Keitel as Andrey (or Andrei) "The Banker" Daddano
Gene Hackman as Valery Michailov
John Cazale as Joseph "Ice Pick Joe" Morelli
Sophia Loren as Sofia
Al Pacino as Mario Ambrosini
Lynda Carter as Dancer #2
Patchka the cat

Martin Scorsese, producer or director (disputed)
Matteo JWHJ0715, writer or director (disputed)
Domenico Procacci, producer
Roy Walker, set designer
Michael Kaplan, costume designer

Origin and development
Goncharov originated when a since-inactive Tumblr user by the name of zootycoon posted a picture of a tag found on a pair of "knockoff boots" which featured details on the nonexistent film Goncharov in place of a brand label, which suggested it was "A film by Matteo JWHJ0715" which was "presented" by Martin Scorsese and included the tagline "The greatest mafia movie ever made". Another user jokingly replied to the post that "this idiot hasn't seen goncharov"; the post was reblogged with the addition of a screenshot of the comment by user Aveline McEntire in August 2020. McEntire's reblog is commonly credited as the origin of the meme. Tumblr user Michael Littrell, investigating the origin of the boots, discovered the tag has similarities to a poster for the 2008 film Gomorrah, directed by Matteo Garrone and presented by Scorsese. Littrell determined that "Matteo JWHJ0715" and Goncharov were likely misprints of the title and credits from the Gomorrah poster. In Goncharov metafiction, users have inconsistently described the film as being directed by either Matteo JWHJ0715 or Scorsese.

Goncharov picked up traction again in late November 2022 when Alex Korotchuk, a Prague-based artist, created a poster for the film that featured a lineup of actors, character names, and crew members, and posted it to Tumblr on November 18. Korotchuk's poster went viral and inspired an elaborate fiction of the film's existence, based on the details it established. Discussion of the film involved detailed critical analysis of the plot, themes, symbolism, and characters, as well as creation of gifs, fan art and erotic fan fiction, all presented as if the film were real. An American music teacher, with the help of at least thirty other people, composed theme music. A Letterboxd page was created, and several "reviews" for Goncharov were posted there, but these were removed from the platform. A public Google Document was created in order to collect and coordinate the various plot and metafictional elements that had developed about the film. Archive of Our Own, a fan fiction site, had over 500 entries for Goncharov as of November 24, 2022. On November 25, 2022, a game jam of Goncharov was run by Autumn Chen on itch.io, inspired by the invention of a nonexistent videogame tie-in.

Reception and analysis
The New York Times reported that Goncharov had become the top trending topic on Tumblr, and Scorsese was the second most popular topic. Some writers correlated the popularity of Goncharov with Elon Musk's purchase of Twitter, after which many users had opted to abandon the platform in favor of Tumblr. Kelsey Weekman of BuzzFeed cited Goncharov as "evidence of the unique power of Tumblr's creative, collaborative minds". Eve Edwards of The Focus described the meme as an attempt to induce the Mandela effect. Linda Codega of Gizmodo remarked on the enthusiasm around the meme as "an inspiring example of collective storytelling and spontaneous fandom generation, inspired by the community itself. Essentially, Goncharov (1973) is not a film, but a game. And only Tumblr knows the rules, because the rules of Goncharov (1973) are the rules of Tumblr itself." Caitlin Quinlan, writing for Empire, noted that the meme had "enough material for an entire franchise thanks to its creative devotees" and expressed the hope that Goncharov "could one day become more of a reality".

The Daily Fix cited Tumblr user David J Prokopetz's analysis as pinpointing its appeal: "The Goncharov meme isn't so much impenetrable to outsiders as it is indistinguishable from business as usual. Goncharov shitposts sound exactly like how film nerds actually sound when discussing a real film which they have not seen, but do not wish to admit they have not seen, so from the uninvolved perspective nothing has changed." Speaking to Vice about the meme, Tumblr user do-you-have-a-flag (also known as simply "Flags") described Goncharov as an extension of the platform's "'yes-and' culture," where users often expand on each other's posts via the platform's reblog function to collaboratively create unexpected narratives and conversations.

The meme of Goncharov was acknowledged positively by Tumblr, whose Twitter account stated that the nonexistent film was "ahead of its time". Lynda Carter, one of the film's fictionalized cast members, similarly played along with her imagined role in the film in a Tumblr post. Ryan Reynolds, less than a month after joining Tumblr, also made a post about his "favorite line" from the film. Author Neil Gaiman, in response to users submitting questions about Goncharov to his Tumblr inbox, expressed disapproval and urged them to desist. On November 25, 2022, Martin Scorsese's daughter posted a video on TikTok of a text exchange with her father, in which she shared The New York Times article on Goncharov and asked if he had seen it. Scorsese replied, "Yes. I made that film years ago."

See also
Mean Streets, a real 1973 Martin Scorsese film
Listenbourg, an internet meme of a fictional country in 2022

References

External links
Goncharov on Fanlore
Goncharov game jam on itch.io

Fictional films
Gay fiction
Internet hoaxes
Internet memes introduced in 2020
Lesbian fiction
Tumblr
Cultural depictions of the Mafia
Martin Scorsese